Everything Is New is the second album from British singer-songwriter Jack Peñate. It was released on 22 June 2009 on XL Recordings. It received much more favourable reviews than his debut Matinée.

The song "Every Glance" features backing vocals from Adele.

Track listing
"Pull My Heart Away" – 4:11
"Be the One" – 4:12
"Everything Is New" – 4:05
"Tonight's Today" – 3:23
"So Near" – 3:37
"Every Glance" – 4:15
"Give Yourself Away" – 3:02
"Let's All Die" – 3:32
"Body Down" – 4:06

Charts

References

2009 albums
Jack Peñate albums
XL Recordings albums
Albums produced by Paul Epworth